Rabbi Shimshon Dovid Pincus (Hebrew:
שמשון דוד פינקוס  
1944/45 – April 2001) was an Israeli Haredi Rabbi of American origin, who served in Ofaqim.

Biography 
In his early years, Rabbi Pincus learned in Beth Hatalmud Rabbinical College yeshiva in New York City under Rabbi Aryeh Leib Malin. Afterwards, he made aliyah to Israel to learn in Brisk yeshiva under Rabbi Berel Soloveitchik, the son of the Brisker Rav. After his marriage, he lived in Bnei Brak and then in the Negev. At this time, he was the Mashgiach of the yeshiva in Ofaqim. Afterwards, he became the Rosh Yeshiva in Yeruham. At the request of Rabbi Elazar Shach and Rabbi Yaakov Yisrael Kanievsky, Rabbi Pincus accepted the position of Chief Rabbi of Ofaqim, where he served for over twenty years. Rabbi Pincus also delivered sermons throughout Israel, America, and South Africa. He used to visit Chile with his parents to strengthen the Kehilah in Torah and Mussar.

Rabbi Pincus and his wife, Chaya had 12 children. His wife administered the religious high school "Neve Yocheved" for girls in Ofaqim. In 2001, at the age of 56, Rabbi Pincus was killed in a car accident, along with his wife and 18-year-old daughter, Miriam. They are buried in Jerusalem.

Audio Lectures
Click here to download MP3 shiurim by Rabbi Shimshon Dovid Pincus

Works
Pincus was renowned as an expert in exegetical understandings of Torah passages. Many people attended his lectures which were recorded on cassette tape, many of which were later transcribed and published after Rabbi Pincus' death. Among his books* are:

'*'These are translations of books that he wrote in Hebrew.

References

External links
Short Bio & Free MP3 Lectures by Rabbi Shimshon Dovid Pincus

1944 births
2001 deaths
American Haredi rabbis
Haredi rabbis in Israel
Road incident deaths in Israel
20th-century American rabbis